Potassium channel subfamily K member 17 is a protein that in humans is encoded by the KCNK17 gene.

This gene encodes K2P17.1, one of the members of the superfamily of potassium channel proteins containing two pore-forming P domains. This open channel, primarily expressed in the pancreas, is activated at alkaline pH.

See also
 Tandem pore domain potassium channel

References

Further reading

External links 
 

Ion channels